Samborska Street (ulica Samborska) is the shortest street in Warsaw and possibly in Poland.

It was laid out in 1770 or 1771.

Its name comes from the Polish family name Samborski, who were Warsaw residents and, at the time, owners of the surrounding land.

No buildings are assigned to the street.  For many years it was almost invisible, overgrown and closed. In 2010 it was renovated and opened to pedestrians, becoming one of the minor attractions of New Town.

External links
 A newspaper article in Polish about the shortest street in Poland
 A newspaper article in Polish on its recent rejuvenation

Streets in Warsaw